Milen Tanev (born 4 March 1987) is a Bulgarian footballer currently playing as a midfielder for Chernomorets Burgas.

Career
Tanev played for Pomorie in the Second League for two seasons but left the club in June 2017 when he signed with Vereya. He then played for Pomorie again in 2019, before returning to Chernomorets Burgas in 2020.

Honours

Club
 Beroe
Bulgarian Cup: 2009-10

References

External links
 
 

1987 births
Living people
Sportspeople from Stara Zagora
Bulgarian footballers
First Professional Football League (Bulgaria) players
Second Professional Football League (Bulgaria) players
PFC Beroe Stara Zagora players
FC Chernomorets Balchik players
FC Caspiy players
FC Botev Galabovo players
PFC Chernomorets Burgas players
FC Pomorie players
FC Vereya players
Bulgarian expatriate footballers
Bulgarian expatriate sportspeople in Kazakhstan
Expatriate footballers in Kazakhstan
Association football midfielders